The Good Neighbor Trail is a multi-use recreational trail in Brooksville, Florida, that connects with the Withlacoochee State Trail. The trail was originally the Brooksville Branch of the Florida Southern Railway which later became an Atlantic Coast Line Railroad line from Brooksville to Croom.

See also
Brooksville Railroad Depot
Florida Coast-to-Coast Trail
Withlacoochee State Trail
Hardy Trail

References

External links
Good Neighbor Trail information  on City of Brooksville's website
 Good Neighbor Trail at 100 Florida Trails  

Rail trails in Florida
Former CSX Transportation lines
Protected areas of Hernando County, Florida
Bike paths in Florida
Brooksville, Florida